Edward Knippers is an American artist, his major works are large scale paintings depicting biblical narratives featuring nude figures.

Edward Knippers attended Asbury College in Wilmore, Kentucky where he attained a BA in fine arts. He later studied at the University of Tennessee and attained a Master of Fine Arts degree in painting. He studied in the studios of Zao Wou-Ki in 1970 and Otto Eglau in 1976 at the International Summer Academy of Fine Arts in Salzburg. In 1976, he was awarded the Prize of Salzburg in print-making. In 1980, he was a fellow at S. W. Hayter's Atelier 17 in Paris. He also studied at the Sorbonne and at the Pennsylvania Academy of Fine Arts.

Since 1983, Knippers has focused his work on Biblical narratives in which the characters are shown in the nude.  In his work, Knippers explores the relationship between Christian faith and the creation of outstanding new visual art. His art is large in scale.

Knippers is an Anglican, he and his wife attend Truro Church (Fairfax, Virginia) where he sings in the choir.

References

Citations

Sources

Further reading

External links

Profile of Edward Knippers at Image
VIOLENT GRACE A Retrospective is a survey of five decades of the paintings of Edward Knippers

Living people
American contemporary painters
Atelier 17 alumni
Year of birth missing (living people)